The 1921 Georgetown Blue and Gray football team represented Georgetown University during the 1921 college football season. Led by Albert Exendine in his eighth year as head coach, the team went 8–1.

Schedule

References

Georgetown
Georgetown Hoyas football seasons
Georgetown Blue and Gray football